Charles Dwight Sigsbee (January 16, 1845 – July 13, 1923) was a rear admiral in the United States Navy. In his earlier career, he was a pioneering oceanographer and hydrographer.

Early life

Sigsbee was born in Albany, New York, and educated at The Albany Academy. He was appointed acting midshipman on 16 July 1862.

Military career
Sigsbee fought in numerous engagements during the American Civil War, mostly against Confederate forts and batteries. In 1871, he was assigned to the Hydrographic Office. He was first posted to the Hydrographic Office in 1873. He was assigned to the Coast Survey in 1874 and commanded the Coast Survey steamer Blake from 1875 to 1878. He returned to the Navy Hydrographic Office from 1878 to 1882 and served as hydrographer in the Bureau of Navigation from 1893 to 1897. During his period on Blake, he developed the Sigsbee sounding machine, which became a standard item of deep-water oceanographic equipment for the next 50 years.

Sigsbee served at the Naval Academy from 1869 to 1871, from 1882 to 1885, and from 1887 to 1890. He served on the Board of Control for the United States Naval Institute. He commanded  on the European station from 1885 to 1886 and the training ship Portsmouth from 1891 to 1892.

Sigsbee took command of the armored cruiser Maine in April 1897. After Maine was destroyed in February 1898, Sigsbee and his officers were exonerated by a court of inquiry. He then commanded  in 1898 at the Second Battle of San Juan and  until 1900.

In February, he was appointed Chief Intelligence Officer of the Office of Naval Intelligence, succeeding Commander Richardson Clover. He held that post until April 1903 when he was succeeded by Commander Seaton Schroeder. He was promoted to rear admiral on 10 August 1903.

He assumed command of the South Atlantic Squadron in 1904 and the Second Division, North Atlantic Squadron, in 1905.

He commanded  as his flagship on June 7, 1905, which sailed for Cherbourg, France. There, the remains of the late John Paul Jones were taken aboard and brought home for his interment at the United States Naval Academy.

Death and legacy
Sigsbee retired from the Navy in 1907 and died in New York, 1923. He is buried in Arlington National Cemetery. His grandson, Charles Dwight Sigsbee III, First Lieutenant, US Army, was buried next to him on July 10, 1956.

Conscious of his legacy, Sigsbee penned a book giving the history of the Maine and his experiences aboard her. The book was entitled The MAINE - An Account of Her Destruction in Havana Harbor and was published by the Century Company of New York in 1899.

His daughter Mary Ellen Sigsbee (1877–1960) was an artist, socialist and feminist.

He has several namesakes:
 The destroyer  was named for him.
 Sigsbee Park, the primary military family housing area for Naval Air Station Key West, and the collocated Sigsbee Elementary School are named in his honor.
 Sigsbee Deep, the deepest part of the Gulf of Mexico, was discovered by ships under his command and was named in his honor.
 On May 25, 1898, Daniel Bevill was appointed postmaster of a new post office in Shelby County, Missouri, but needed a name for the office. Bevill had so admired Sigsbee, a naval officer in command of the battleship Maine, which blew up in Havana Harbor in 1898, that he named the post office site as Sigsbee (Shelby County Historical Society records).

Ranks held

 Midshipman – September 27, 1859
 Passed Midshipman – 1863
 Master – May 10, 1866
 Commodore - Jan 4, 1867

References

External links

 Finding Aid to Charles D. Sigsbee Papers, 1858–1923 at the New York State Library, accessed May 18, 2016.

1845 births
1923 deaths
American cartographers
American hydrographers
American oceanographers
United States Navy personnel of the Spanish–American War
United States Navy admirals
Military personnel from Albany, New York
Union Navy officers
Burials at Arlington National Cemetery
Directors of the Office of Naval Intelligence
The Albany Academy alumni